Máel Muire may refer to:

 Máel Muire of Cennrígmonaid, possible 10th century bishop of Cennrígmonaid, modern-day Saint Andrews
 Máel Muire mac Céilechair (died 1106), Irish cleric and scribe at the monastery of Clonmacnoise
 Máel Muire, Earl of Atholl, early 12th century Scot ruler
 Máel Muire ingen Cináeda (died 913), daughter of Kenneth MacAlpin, king of the Picts, wife of two Irish kings

See also
 Máel Muire (female name)